Xerochlamys tampoketsensis is a tree in the family Sarcolaenaceae. It is endemic to Madagascar.

Description
The tree's flowers are occasionally solitary or generally in inflorescences of two flowers, with pale yellow petals.

Distribution and habitat
Xerochlamys tampoketsensis is only found in the regions of Analamanga, Betsiboka, Melaky and Sofia. Only one population of the trees is in a protected area. The conservation status of the species is vulnerable.

References

tampoketsensis
Endemic flora of Madagascar
Trees of Madagascar
Plants described in 1915